The 2014 UCI BMX World Championships were the nineteenth edition of the UCI BMX World Championships and took place in Rotterdam, Netherlands, and crowned world champions in the cycling discipline of BMX.

Medal summary

Medal table

References

External links
Official event website

UCI BMX World Championships
UCI BMX World Championships
UCI BMX World Championships
International cycle races hosted by the Netherlands